Mitcheldean is a market town in the Forest of Dean in Gloucestershire, England.

History
Mitcheldean was a thriving community for many centuries due to the town's proximity to iron ore deposits. During the 19th century, the town grew due to revenues produced by the local brewing industry.

Like several of the Forest of Dean villages, Mitcheldean is a close-knit community with individual traditions. One of these was the locally famous (or infamous) Mitcheldean Prize Brass Band. It is vividly remembered and described in a memoir by Arthur Bullock, a resident of nearby Longhope, whose father and brothers were in it. Recounting the band's exploits, he comments, 'I only wish I could have been privileged to hear the Mitcheldean Prize Brass Band play when all of the players were fully sober at the same time'. However, it is indeed sobering to read his further reflection that the band must have been 'killed off by the 1914-18 war'.

In the 20th century the town grew further due to the Rank Xerox photocopier factory. Although this industry significantly declined during the latter half of the 20th century, much of the former Rank Xerox site (now Vantage Point Business Village) is now occupied by small businesses, new manufacturing and distribution businesses.

Transport
Mitcheldean is served by buses 24/24a, 25, 33 and 746, which give it regular connections to Hereford, Gloucester, Cinderford, Coleford, Ross-on-Wye, Lydney and Chepstow. Mitcheldean was served by Mitcheldean Road railway station on the former Hereford, Ross and Gloucester Railway until its closure in 1964. The station was quite a distance from the town almost two miles away in Lea, Herefordshire. The nearest station was actually Longhope railway station in the neighboring village of Longhope. Today, the nearest railway station is Gloucester railway station and, further afield, Ledbury railway station.

Governance
The town is the most populous area of 'Mitcheldean and Drybrook' electoral ward. This ward starts in the north east at Mitcheldean and stretches south westerly to Drybrook. The total ward population taken at the 2011 census was 4,607.

Amenities
There are several shops in the centre of the town, a Co-operative store, a butcher. 3 hairdressers, a pharmacy, a florist and 3 fast food outlets. There is also a community library, a doctor's surgery, a town hall, two pubs. There is also a Brewery bar/pub and separate restaurant in the Mews.

Church of St Michael

Mitcheldean's wealthy tradition is evident in some of its buildings in the town centre, particularly the church of St. Michael.

Schools
The town has a secondary school, Dene Magna School, which has performed consistently well in Ofsted inspections since 2001. The school has a sixth form and provides A-levels at a second campus in Cinderford which is a shared space with GlosCol. The other options for Year 12 students are Gloucestershire College, Newent Community School and Sixth Form Centre in Newent, John Kyrle High School in Ross-on-Wye, Monmouth Comprehensive School in Monmouth or one of the grammar school-based sixth forms in Gloucester. As well as a secondary school, Mitcheldean has a primary school of about 250 children.

Sport - Football
Mitcheldean has 2 men's team. The team competes in the North Gloucestershire Association Football League. The club also has a Ladies team and a thriving youth section

References

External links

 Mitcheldean

 
Towns in Gloucestershire
Civil parishes in Gloucestershire
Forest of Dean